49 Armoured Regiment is an armoured regiment of the Indian Army.

Formation
The regiment was raised on 1 October 1983 under the command of Lieutenant Colonel JPS Nakai at Ahmednagar. It has an all-India, all-class composition, drawing troops from various castes and religions. Lieutenant General SS Mahal, VSM is the current Colonel of the Regiment.

Gallantry awards
The regiment has won the following gallantry awards - 
Sena Medal - Major Amit Rathi

Other achievements
Sowar Pradeep Kumar of the regiment won a Silver Medal in the Free Rifle 300 Metres (Three Position) event at the 26th All India GV Mavalankar Shooting Championship.

Regimental insignia
The Regimental insignia consists of crossed lances with pennons mounted with the Lion Capital of Ashoka, with the numeral "49" inscribed on the crossing of the lances and a scroll at the base with the words "ARMOURED REGIMENT".

References

Armoured and cavalry regiments of the Indian Army from 1947
Military units and formations established in 1983